Troublesome Night is a comedy-horror anthology film series from Hong Kong. As of 2020 the series has 20 entries.

History
The original run of films lasted between 1997 and 2003 and had 19 films. which means that the original Troublesome Night spawned more sequels than any other horror film at the time. The first six films were directed by Herman Yau but after that he lost interest and producer Nam Yin kept the series alive. A 20th installment was released in 2017 to celebrate the 20th anniversary of the first film.

Instalments
 Troublesome Night
 Troublesome Night 2
 Troublesome Night 3
 Troublesome Night 4
 Troublesome Night 5
 Troublesome Night 6
 Troublesome Night 7
 Troublesome Night 8
 Troublesome Night 9
 Troublesome Night 10
 Troublesome Night 11
 Troublesome Night 12
 Troublesome Night 13
 Troublesome Night 14
 Troublesome Night 15
 Troublesome Night 16
 Troublesome Night 17
 Troublesome Night 18
 Troublesome Night 19
 Always Be with You

See also
 Cantonese culture
 Chinese horror film

References

External links
 Troublesome Night Series at YesAsia

 
Film series introduced in 1997
Hong Kong film series
Horror film series
Cantonese-language films
Anthology film series
Comedy film series